Heather Ammons Crawford is an American politician who has served in the South Carolina House of Representatives from the 68th district since 2012.

Crawford serves on the House Ways and Means Committee.

References

Living people
Republican Party members of the South Carolina House of Representatives
Year of birth missing (living people)
21st-century American politicians
Women state legislators in South Carolina